A Journey of Samyak Buddha (Hindi: अ जर्नी ऑफ सम्यक बुद्ध) is a 2013 Indian film about the journey of Gautam Buddha’s miraculous birth, marriage, and his path towards enlightenment. The biographical film is based on Babasaheb Ambedkar's book The Buddha and His Dhamma.

Synopsis

Gautam Buddha's biographical movie showcases different facets of his enlightened life.

Cast
The actors in the film included:

 Gita Agrawal
 Jyoti Bhagat
 Ravi Patil
 Gautam Degre
 Abhishek Urade
 Mrilan Sharma
 Abhay Sathe
 Gangadhar Patil
 Jeevan Chore
 Jaya Kamble
 Ashok Sontakke
 Pradeep
 Rashtrapal Wasekar
 Kutramare
 Shankar Machani
 Sunil Dhale
 Harsha Kamble
 Dipankar Salim Sheikh
 Hrithik Roshan
 Sneha Kamble
 Savita Jhamrz

Artist list 
 Abhishek Urade as the Buddha
 Ravi Patil as father
 Geeta Agrawal as Prajapati
 Jyoti Bagat as mother
 Mrinal Pendharkar as Yashodhara (gautam's wife.)
 Gautam Dhengare as Bhikshoo Anand

Production

The film was directed and produced by Pravin Damle and it is being distributed by Manoj Nandwana's Jai Viratra Entertainment Limited.  The movie is set release to all over India on 26 July 2013.
by 2019, the Tibetan dubbed was released with a language of Dzongkha And Tibetan.

See also
Depictions of Gautama Buddha in film

References

External links 
 
 http://www.bollywoodhungama.com/moviemicro/cast/id/503896

2013 films
Indian biographical films
Films based on non-fiction books
Films about Gautama Buddha
2010s Hindi-language films

Navayana
Films about Buddhism
Films about B. R. Ambedkar